The Río Chico de Nono is a stream in the Traslasierra Valley, Province of Córdoba, Argentina. The natural spas of Los Remansos and Paso de las Tropas are located along the river.

Upper reaches

Channel

See also
Nono, Argentina

References

External links
Anaqmanta Wasi | Nono
Río Chico de Nono: una historia del vínculo sociedad y río en el oeste Cordobés 1870-1935

Tourism in Argentina
Tourist attractions in Córdoba Province, Argentina
Populated places in Córdoba Province, Argentina